The 1899 Ohio Green and White football team was an American football team that represented Ohio University as an independent during the 1899 college football season. Led by first-year head coach Fred Sullivan, the team compiled a record of 2–2.

Schedule

References

Ohio
Ohio Bobcats football seasons
Ohio Green and White football